The 1929 PGA Championship was the 12th PGA Championship, held December 2–7 at Hillcrest Country Club in Los Angeles, California. Then a match play championship, defending champion Leo Diegel defeated Johnny Farrell 6 & 4 in the finals to win the second of his two major titles.

Like the year before, Diegel defeated both Walter Hagen and Gene Sarazen on his way to the title; this year he won 3 & 2 over both, Sarazen in the quarterfinals and Hagen in the semifinals.

Prior to his loss to Diegel in the semifinals, five-time champion Hagen was 35–2 in match play at the PGA Championship in the 1920s, losing only to Sarazen in 38 holes in the 1923 finals, and Diegel 2 & 1 in the 1928 quarterfinals. Hagen's victory over Tony Manero in the 1929 quarterfinals was his last match win at the PGA Championship until 1940; he was winless in the 1930s with five first round losses.

This was the first major championship played in the western United States; it was originally scheduled to be played in Santa Barbara. The PGA Championship returned to the west a dozen years later in 1941 in Colorado.

In the Cheviot Hills neighborhood of Los Angeles, 
Hillcrest later hosted the Los Angeles Open on the PGA Tour in 1932 and 1942, the latter won by Ben Hogan in an 18-hole playoff.

Format
The match play format at the PGA Championship in 1929 called for 12 rounds (216 holes) in six days:
 Monday – 36-hole stroke play qualifier
top 32 professionals advanced to match play
 Tuesday – first round – 36 holes 
 Wednesday – second round – 36 holes 
 Thursday – quarterfinals – 36 holes 
 Friday – semifinals – 36 holes 
 Saturday – final – 36 holes

Past champions in the field

Final results
Saturday, December 7, 1929

Final eight bracket

Final match scorecards
Morning

Afternoon

Source:

References

External links
PGA Media Guide 2012
PGA.com – 1929 PGA Championship

PGA Championship
Golf in Los Angeles
PGA Championship
PGA Championship
PGA Championship
PGA Championship